Elciego is a town and municipality located at the southern end of the province of Álava, in the Basque Country, northern Spain.

This town lies in the world-famous Rioja wine-production region, and is home to the architecturally cutting-edge Hotel Marqués de Riscal, opened in 2006, designed by renowned architect Frank Gehry.

References

External links

 ELCIEGO in the Bernardo Estornés Lasa - Auñamendi Encyclopedia 
 Hotel Marqués de Riscal website

Municipalities in Álava